Dynamic Chiropractic is a magazine for chiropractors that is indexed by CINAHL. The publisher is MPA Media. A Canadian version exists with modified content. The Canadian version has a readership of 6000, while the American version has a circulation of over 60,000.

References

External links
 Magazine web site

1982 establishments in California
Biweekly magazines published in the United States
Business magazines published in the United States
Chiropractic
Chiropractic journals
Health magazines
Magazines established in 1982
Magazines published in California
Professional and trade magazines